The Open the Owarai Gate Championship was a professional wrestling title in Japanese promotion Dragon Gate. The word owarai in the title's name is the Japanese word for comedy.

The championship was first conceived during Stalker Ichikawa's first United States tour, joining fellow Dragon Gate wrestlers Cima, Naruki Doi, Masato Yoshino and Don Fujii during the Pro Wrestling Guerrilla two-night event Dynamite Duumvirate Tag Team Title Tournament on May 19 and May 20, 2007, in Burbank, California.  In addition to changing his name to "Hollywood" Stalker Ichikawa, he also gave birth to the Open the Owarai Gate Championship which he wore during the second night of the event against Top Gun Talwar. The name change and the introduction of the belt was made official on May 25. The championship was deactivated at Dead or Alive 2018, when Shingo Takagi, per stipulation, was the last person to escape the cage in the Hair vs. Hair Steel Cage Survival seven-way match.

The championship is both unique and very unusual. The title is not necessarily defended by traditional methods of simply beating the champion by pinfalls or submission. While such a situation can still happen, the title also has a stipulation regarding audience approval during the match. This means that while the champion could still technically lose the match, he could retain the belt simply by having earning more applause and/or laughter from the audience.

The championship was defended for the first time on June 10 at Hakata Star Lanes in Fukuoka, Fukuoka. In addition, Ichikawa also began by having ten "Free Defense" tickets that would ensure he would always retain the title regardless. However, before his defense against Kikutaro on September 22 at the Ota-ku Gymnasium in Tokyo, the tickets were destroyed and he was forced to defend the belt on his own merit. He was able to successfully retain due to unusual circumstances since, such as his mother appealing to the crowd and later his opponent feeling sorry.

Title history

Combined reigns

See also
Osaka Pro Wrestling Owarai Championship

References

Exterminal link
Open the Owarai Gate Championship

Dragon Gate (wrestling) championships